The twelve Mambiloid languages are languages spoken by the Mambila and related peoples mostly in eastern Nigeria and  in Cameroon. In Nigeria the largest group is Mambila (there is also a small Mambila population in Cameroon).  In Cameroon the largest group is Vute.

Languages
The following classification follows Blench (2011). Languages with (?) are not listed in that source, but close to other languages according to Ethnologue. Ndoro–Fam may be a separate branch of Benue–Congo.
Ndoola (Ndoro)
Mambiloid proper
Nizaa (Suga)
Mambila–Konja
Konja: Kwanja, ?Twendi
Mambila–Vute
Mambila–Kamkam
Magu–Kamkam–Kila: Mbongno, Mvanip (Mvano), ?Somyev, ?Ndunda
Mambila
Tep–Vute
Tep
Vute: Vute, Wawa

Ethnologue also lists Njerep, which most likely lies somewhere in the Mambila–Kamkam branch. The extinct Yeni, Luo and Kasabe languages were apparently Mambiloid, the first two close to Njerep.

Fam is sometimes classified with Ndoro, but appears to be more divergent.

The unclassified language Bung shows its strongest resemblance to be with the Ndung dialect of Kwanja. It also has words in common with other Mambiloid languages such as Tep, Somyev and Vute, while a number of words' origins remain unclear (possibly Adamawan).

Names and locations (Nigeria)
Below is a list of language names, populations, and locations (in Nigeria only) from Blench (2019).

References

 Blench, Roger, 2011. 'The membership and internal structure of Bantoid and the border with Bantu'. Bantu IV, Humboldt University, Berlin.

External links
Marieke Martin, 2011. 'The Erosion of Noun Classes in Mambiloid'

 
Northern Bantoid languages